Falcon 9 is a partially reusable Heavy-lift launch vehicle that can carry cargo and crew into Earth orbit, produced by American aerospace company SpaceX.

The rocket has two stages. The first (booster) stage carries the second stage and payload to a certain altitude, after which the second stage lifts the payload to its ultimate destination. The rocket evolved through several versions. V1.0 flew from 2010–2013, V1.1 flew from 2013–2016, while V1.2 Full Thrust first launched in 2015, encompassing the Block 5 variant, flying since May 2018.

The booster is capable of landing vertically to facilitate reuse. This feat was first achieved on flight 20 in December 2015. Since then, SpaceX has successfully landed boosters over 100 times. Individual boosters have flown as many as 15 flights. Both stages are powered by SpaceX Merlin engines, using cryogenic liquid oxygen and rocket-grade kerosene (RP-1) as propellants.

The former was launched into an advantageous super-synchronous transfer orbit, while the latter went into a lower-energy GTO, with an apogee well below the geostationary altitude.

Falcon 9 is human-rated for transporting NASA astronauts to the ISS. Falcon 9 is certified for the National Security Space Launch program and NASA Launch Services Program as "Category 3", which can launch the most expensive, important, and complex NASA missions.

The first mission launched on 8 October 2012.

As of January 2021, Falcon 9 had the most launches among U.S. rockets. It is the only U.S. rocket certified for transporting humans to the International Space Station. It is the only commercial rocket to ever launch humans to orbit. On 24 January 2021, Falcon 9 set a record for the most satellites launched by a single rocket, carrying 143 into orbit.

Development history

Conception and funding 
In October 2005, SpaceX announced plans to launch Falcon 9 in the first half of 2007. The initial launch would not occur until 2010.

While SpaceX spent its own capital to develop its previous launcher, the Falcon 1, development of the Falcon 9 was accelerated by partial NASA funding  and commitments to purchase flights once specific capabilities were demonstrated. Funding started with seed money from the Commercial Orbital Transportation Services (COTS) program in 2006. The contract was structured as a Space Act Agreement (SAA) "to develop and demonstrate commercial orbital transportation service", including the purchase of three demonstration flights. The overall contract award was US$278 million to provide three demonstration launches of Falcon 9 with the SpaceX Dragon cargo spacecraft. Additional milestones were added later, raising the total contract value to US$396 million.

In 2008, SpaceX won a Commercial Resupply Services (CRS) contract in NASA's Commercial Orbital Transportation Services (COTS) program to deliver cargo to ISS using Falcon 9/Dragon. Funds would be disbursed only after the demonstration missions were successfully and thoroughly completed. The contract totaled US$1.6 billion for a minimum of 12 missions to ferry supplies to and from ISS.

In 2011, SpaceX estimated that Falcon 9 v1.0 development costs were on the order of US$300 million. NASA estimated development costs of US$3.6 billion had a traditional cost-plus contract approach been used. A 2011 NASA report "estimated that it would have cost the agency about US$4 billion to develop a rocket like the Falcon 9 booster based upon NASA's traditional contracting processes" while "a more commercial development" approach might have allowed the agency to pay only US$1.7 billion".

In 2014, SpaceX released combined development costs for Falcon 9 and Dragon. NASA provided US$396 million, while SpaceX provided over US$450 million.

Congressional testimony by SpaceX in 2017 suggested that the unusual NASA process of "setting only a high-level requirement for cargo transport to the space station [while] leaving the details to industry" had allowed SpaceX to complete the task at a substantially lower cost. "According to NASA's own independently verified numbers, SpaceX's development costs of both the Falcon 1 and Falcon 9 rockets were estimated at approximately $390 million in total."

Development 
SpaceX originally intended to follow its Falcon 1 launch vehicle with an intermediate capacity vehicle, Falcon 5. In 2005, SpaceX announced that it was instead proceeding with Falcon 9, a "fully reusable heavy-lift launch vehicle", and had already secured a government customer. Falcon 9 was intended to support LEO and GTO missions, as well as crew and cargo missions to ISS.

Testing 
The original NASA COTS contract called for the first demonstration flight in September 2008, and the completion of all three demonstration missions by September 2009. In February 2008, the date slipped into the first quarter of 2009. According to Musk, complexity and Cape Canaveral regulatory requirements contributed to the delay.

The first multi-engine test (two engines firing simultaneously, connected to the first stage) was completed in January 2008. Successive tests led to a 178 second (mission length), nine engine test-fire in November 2008. In October 2009, the first flight-ready all-engine test fire was at its test facility in McGregor, Texas. In November, SpaceX conducted the initial second stage test firing, lasting forty seconds. In January 2010, a 329 second (mission length) orbit-insertion firing of the second stage was conducted at McGregor.

The elements of the stack arrived at the launch site for integration at the beginning of February, 2010. The flight stack went vertical at Space Launch Complex 40, Cape Canaveral, and in March, SpaceX performed a static fire test, where the first stage was fired without launch. The test was aborted at T−2 due to a failure in the high-pressure helium pump. All systems up to the abort performed as expected, and no additional issues needed addressing. A subsequent test on 13 March fired the first-stage engines for 3.5 seconds.

Production 

In December 2010, the SpaceX production line manufactured a Falcon 9 (and Dragon spacecraft) every three months. The factory was producing one Falcon 9 per month as of November 2013.

By February 2016 the production rate for Falcon 9 cores had increased to 18 per year, and the number of first stage cores that could be assembled at one time reached six.

Since 2018, SpaceX has routinely reused first stages, reducing the demand for new cores. In 2021, SpaceX performed 31 F9 launches, using only two new boosters. It successfully recovered the booster on all but one flight. The Hawthorne factory produces one (expendable) second stage for each launch.

Launch history

Notable flights 

 Flight 1, Dragon Spacecraft Qualification Unit — June 2010, first flight of Falcon 9 and first test of Dragon,
 Flight 3, Dragon C2+ — first cargo delivery to the International Space Station,
 Flight 4, CRS-1 — first operational cargo mission to the  ISS, and the first demonstration of the rocket's engine-out capability due to the failure of a first-stage Merlin engine,
 Flight 6, CASSIOPE — first v1.1 rocket, first launch from Vandenberg AFB, first attempt at propulsive return of the first stage,
 Flight 7, SES-8 — first launch to Geosynchronous transfer orbit (GTO), first non-governmental payload,
 Flight 9, CRS-3 — added landing legs, first fully controlled descent and vertical ocean touchdown,
 Flight 15, Deep Space Climate Observatory (DSCOVR) — first hyperbolic mission, injecting spacecraft into L1 point,
 Flight 19, CRS-7 — total loss of mission due to structural failure and helium overpressure in the second stage,
 Flight 20, Orbcomm OG-2 — first vertical landing of an orbital-class rocket,
 Flight 23, CRS-8 — first landing vertically achieved on an autonomous spaceport drone ship at sea,
 AMOS-6 — total vehicle and payload loss prior to static fire test (would have been Flight 29),
 Flight 30, CRS-10 — first launch from LC-39A at the Kennedy Space Center,
 Flight 32, SES-10 — first reflight of a previously flown orbital class booster (B1021, previously used for SpaceX CRS-8), first recovery of a fairing,
 Flight 41, X-37B OTV-5 — first launch of a spaceplane,
 Flight 54 Bangabandhu-1 — the first flight of the Block 5 version,
 Flight 58 Telstar 19V — heaviest communications satellite ever delivered to GEO,
 Flight 69 Crew Dragon Demo-1 — first launch of the Crew Dragon (did not carry astronauts),
 Flight 72, RADARSAT Constellation — the most valuable commercial payload put into orbit,
 Flight 81 — a Starlink launch, was a successful flight, but had the first recovery failure of a previously flown and recovered booster,
 Flight 83 — a successful Starlink launch, saw the first failure of a Merlin 1D first-stage engine during ascent, and the second ascent engine failure on the rocket following CRS-1 on flight 4,
 Flight 85, Crew Dragon Demo-2 — the first crewed launch of the Crew Dragon, carrying two astronauts,
 Flight 98, Crew-1 — the first crewed operational launch of the Crew Dragon, holding the record for the longest spaceflight by a U.S. crew vehicle,
 Flight 101, CRS-21 — the first launch of the Cargo Dragon 2, an uncrewed variant of the Crew Dragon,
 Flight 106, Transporter-1 — the first dedicated smallsat rideshare launch, set the record of the most satellites launched on a single launch with 143 satellites, surpassing the previous record of 108 satellites held by the November 17, 2018 launch of an Antares,
 Flight 108 — a routine Starlink launch which experienced early shut-down of a first-stage Merlin 1D engine during ascent due to damage, but still delivered the payload to the target orbit,
 Flight 126, Inspiration4 — the first orbital spaceflight of an all-private crew,
 Flight 129, DART — first planetary defenses mission against near-Earth objects,
 Flight 134, CRS-24 — the 100th successful vertical landing of an orbital-class rocket, on the sixth anniversary of the first landing in 2015,

Design 

F9 is a two-stage, LOX/RP-1-powered launch vehicle.

Engine 

Both stages are equipped with Merlin 1D rocket engines. Each Merlin engine produces  of thrust. Every engine uses a pyrophoric mixture of triethylaluminum-triethylborane (TEA-TEB) as an engine igniter.

The booster stage has 9 engines, while the 2nd stage has 1 vacuum-adapted version. The booster engines are arranged in what SpaceX calls Octaweb.

Falcon 9 is capable of losing 2 engines and still complete the mission. The Merlin 1D engines can vector thrust to adjust trajectory.

Each Merlin rocket engine is controlled by three voting computers, each having 2 CPUs which constantly check the other 2 in the trio.

Tanks 
The propellant tank walls and domes are made from aluminium–lithium alloy. SpaceX uses an all friction-stir welded tank, for its strength and reliability. The second stage tank is a shorter version of the first stage tank. It uses most of the same tooling, material, and manufacturing techniques.

The F9 interstage, which connects the upper and lower stages, is a carbon-fibre aluminium-core composite structure that holds reusable separation collets and a pneumatic pusher system. The original stage separation system had twelve attachment points, reduced to three for v1.1.

Fairing 
F9 uses a payload fairing (nose cone) to protect (non-Dragon) satellites during launch. SpaceX designed and fabricates fairings in Hawthorne. Testing was completed at NASA's Plum Brook Station facility in spring 2013 where the acoustic shock and mechanical vibration of launch, plus electromagnetic static discharge conditions, were simulated on a full-size test article in a vacuum chamber.

Control systems 
SpaceX uses multiple redundant flight computers in a fault-tolerant design. The software runs on Linux and is written in C++. For flexibility, commercial off-the-shelf parts and system-wide radiation-tolerant design are used instead of rad-hardened parts. Each stage has stage-level flight computers, in addition to the Merlin-specific engine controllers, of the same fault-tolerant triad design to handle stage control functions. Each engine microcontroller CPU runs on a PowerPC architecture.

Legs/fins 
Boosters that will be deliberately expended do not have legs or fins. Recoverable boosters include four extensible landing legs attached around the base. To control the core's descent through the atmosphere, SpaceX uses grid fins that deploy from the vehicle moments after stage separation.

Versions 
V1.0 flew five successful orbital launches from 2010–2013. The much larger V1.1 made its first flight in September 2013. The demonstration mission carried a small  primary payload, the CASSIOPE satellite. Larger payloads followed, starting with the launch of the SES-8 GEO communications satellite. Both v1.0 and v1.1 used expendable launch vehicles (ELVs). The Falcon 9 Full Thrust made its first flight in December 2015. The first stage of the Full Thrust version was reusable. The current version, known as Falcon 9 Block 5, made its first flight in May 2018.

V1.0 

F9 v1.0 was an expendable launch vehicle developed from 2005–2010. It flew for the first time in 2010. V1.0 made five flights, after which it was retired. The first stage was powered by nine Merlin 1C engines arranged in a 3 × 3 grid. The second stage was powered by a single Merlin 1C engine modified for vacuum operation, with an expansion ratio of 117:1 and a nominal burn time of 345 seconds. Gaseous N thrusters were used on the second-stage as a reaction control system (RCS).

Early attempts to add a lightweight thermal protection system to the booster stage and parachute recovery were not successful.

In 2011, SpaceX began a formal development program for a reusable Falcon 9, initially focusing on the first stage.

V1.1 

V1.1 is 60% heavier with 60% more thrust than v1.0. Its nine (more powerful) Merlin 1D engines were rearranged into an "octagonal" pattern that SpaceX called Octaweb. This is designed to simplify and streamline manufacturing. The fuel tanks were 60% longer, making the rocket more susceptible to bending during flight.

The stage separation system was redesigned to reduce the number of attachment points from twelve to three, and the vehicle had upgraded avionics and software.

SpaceX president Gwynne Shotwell stated the v1.1 had about 30% more payload capacity than published on its price list, with the extra margin reserved for returning stages via powered re-entry.

Development testing of the first stage was completed in July 2013. First launch came in September 2013.

The second stage igniter propellant lines were later insulated to better support in-space restart following long coast phases for orbital trajectory maneuvers.  Four extensible carbon fiber/aluminum honeycomb landing legs were included on later flights where landings were attempted.

SpaceX pricing and payload specifications published for v1.1  included about 30% more performance than the published price list indicated; SpaceX reserved the additional performance to perform reusability testing. Many engineering changes to support reusability and recovery of the first stage were made for v1.1.

V1.2/Full thrust 

The v1.2 upgrade, also known as Full Thrust (FT), made major changes. It added cryogenic propellant cooling to increase density allowing 17% higher thrust, improved the stage separation system, stretched the second stage to hold additional propellant, and strengthened struts for holding helium bottles believed to have been involved with the failure of flight 19. It offered a reusable first stage. Plans to reuse the second-stage were abandoned as the weight of a heat shield and other equipment would reduce payload too much. The reusable booster was developed using systems and software tested on the Falcon 9 prototypes.

The Autonomous Flight Safety System (AFSS) replaced the ground-based mission flight control personnel and equipment. AFSS offered on-board Positioning, Navigation and Timing sources and decision logic. The benefits of AFSS included increased public safety, reduced reliance on range infrastructure, reduced range spacelift cost, increased schedule predictability and availability, operational flexibility, and launch slot flexibility".

FT's capacity allowed SpaceX to choose between increasing payload, decreasing launch price, or both.

Its first successful landing came in December 2015 and the first reflight in March 2017.  In February 2017, CRS-10 launch was the first operational launch utilizing AFSS. All SpaceX launches after 16 March used AFSS. A 25 June mission carried the second batch of ten Iridium NEXT satellites, for which the aluminium grid fins were replaced by larger titanium versions, to improve control authority, and heat tolerance during re-entry.

Block 4 
In 2017, SpaceX started including incremental changes, internally dubbed Block 4. Initially, only the second stage was modified to Block 4 standards, flying on top of a Block 3 first stage for three missions: NROL-76 and Inmarsat-5 F5 in May 2017, and Intelsat 35e in July 2017. Block 4 was described as a transition between the Full Thrust v1.2 Block 3 and Block 5. It includes incremental engine thrust upgrades leading to  Block 5. The maiden flight of the full Block 4 design (first and second stages) was the SpaceX CRS-12 mission on 14 August.

Block 5 

In October 2016, Musk described Block 5 as coming with "a lot of minor refinements that collectively are important, but uprated thrust and improved legs are the most significant". In January 2017, Musk added that Block 5 "significantly improves performance and ease of reusability". The maiden flight took place on 11 May 2018, with the Bangabandhu Satellite-1 satellite. The Block 5 second stage included upgrades to enable it to linger in orbit and reignite its engine three or more times.

Capabilities

Performance

Reliability 
SpaceX CRS-1 succeeded in its primary mission, but left a secondary payload in a wrong orbit, while SpaceX CRS-7 was destroyed in flight. In addition, AMOS-6 disintegrated on the launch pad during fueling for an engine test. Based on the Lewis point estimate of reliability, the Falcon 9 Full Thrust had become the most reliable orbital launch vehicle then in operation. For comparison, the industry benchmark Soyuz series has performed 1880 launches with a success rate of 95.1% (the latest Soyuz-2's success rate is 94%), the Russian Proton series has performed 425 launches with a success rate of 88.7% (the latest Proton-M's success rate is 90.1%), the European Ariane 5 has performed 110 launches with a success rate of 95.5%, and Chinese Long March 3B has performed 85 launches with a success rate of 95.3%.

F9's launch sequence includes a hold-down feature that allows full engine ignition and systems check before liftoff. After the first-stage engine starts, the launcher is held down and not released for flight until all propulsion and vehicle systems are confirmed to be operating normally. Similar hold-down systems have been used on launch vehicles such as Saturn V and Space Shuttle. An automatic safe shut-down and unloading of propellant occur if any abnormal conditions are detected. Prior to the launch date, SpaceX typically completes a test cycle, culminating in a three-and-a-half second first stage engine static firing.

F9 has triple-redundant flight computers and inertial navigation, with a GPS overlay for additional accuracy.

Engine-out capability 
Like the Saturn, multiple engines allow for mission completion even if one fails. Detailed descriptions of destructive engine failure modes and designed-in engine-out capabilities were made public.

SpaceX emphasized that the first stage is designed for "engine-out" capability. CRS-1 in October 2012 was a partial success after engine no. 1 lost pressure at 79 seconds, and then shut down. To compensate for the resulting loss of acceleration, the first stage had to burn 28 seconds longer than planned, and the second stage had to burn an extra 15 seconds. That extra burn time reduced fuel reserves so that the likelihood that there was sufficient fuel to execute the mission dropped from 99% to 95%. Because NASA had purchased the launch and therefore contractually controlled several mission decision points, NASA declined SpaceX's request to restart the second stage and attempt to deliver the secondary payload into the correct orbit. As a result, the secondary payload reentered the atmosphere.

Merlin 1D engines have suffered two premature shutdowns on ascent. Neither has affected the primary mission, but both landing attempts failed. On an 18 March 2020 Starlink mission, one of the first stage engines failed 3 seconds before cut-off due to the ignition of some isopropyl alcohol that was not properly purged after cleaning. On another Starlink mission on 15 February 2021, hot exhaust gasses entered an engine due to a fatigue-related hole in its cover. SpaceX stated the failed cover had the "highest... number of flights that this particular boot [cover] design had seen."

Reusability 

SpaceX planned from the beginning to make both stages reusable. The first stages of early Falcon flights were equipped with parachutes and were covered with a layer of ablative cork to allow them to survive atmospheric re-entry. These were defeated by the accompanying aerodynamic stress and heating. The stages were salt-water corrosion-resistant.

In late 2011, SpaceX eliminated parachutes in favor of powered descent. The design was complete by February 2012.

Powered landings were first flight-tested with the suborbital Grasshopper rocket. In March 2013, SpaceX announced that as of the first v1.1 flight, every booster would be equipped for powered descent.

Post-mission flight tests and landing attempts 

For Flight 6 in September 2013, after stage separation, the flight plan called for the first stage to conduct a burn to reduce its reentry velocity, and then a second burn just before reaching the water. Although not a complete success, the stage was able to change direction and make a controlled entry into the atmosphere. During the final landing burn, the RCS thrusters could not overcome an aerodynamically induced spin. The centrifugal force deprived the engine of fuel, leading to early engine shutdown and a hard splashdown.

After four more ocean landing tests, the CRS-5 booster attempted a landing on the ASDS floating platform in January 2015. The rocket incorporated (for the first time in an orbital mission) grid fin aerodynamic control surfaces, and successfully guided itself to the ship, before running out of hydraulic fluid and crashing into the platform. A second attempt occurred in April 2015, on CRS-6. After the launch, the bipropellant valve became stuck, preventing the control system from reacting rapidly enough for a successful landing.

The first attempt to land a booster on a ground pad near the launch site occurred on flight 20, in December 2015. The landing was successful and the booster was recovered. This was the first time in history that after launching an orbital mission, a first stage achieved a controlled vertical landing. The first successful booster landing on an ASDS occurred in April 2016 on the drone ship Of Course I Still Love You during CRS-8.

Sixteen test flights were conducted from 2013 to 2016, six of which achieved a soft landing and booster recovery. Since January 2017, with the exceptions of the centre core from the Falcon Heavy test flight, Falcon Heavy USAF STP-2 mission, the Falcon 9 CRS-16 resupply mission and the Starlink-4 and 5 missions, every landing attempt has been successful. The only post-landing loss of a first stage occurred on Falcon Heavy Arabsat-6A after the centre core fell overboard during rough seas on the voyage to land.

Relaunch 

The first operational relaunch of a previously flown booster was accomplished in March 2017 with B1021 on the SES-10 mission after CRS-8 in April 2016. After landing a second time it was retired. In June 2017, booster B1029 helped carry BulgariaSat-1 towards GTO after an Iridium NEXT LEO mission in January 2017, again achieving reuse and landing of a recovered booster. The third reuse flight came in November 2018 on the SSO-A mission. The core for the mission, Falcon 9 B1046, was the first Block 5 booster produced, and had flown initially on the Bangabandhu Satellite-1 mission.

In May 2021 the first booster reached 10 missions. Musk indicated that SpaceX intends to fly boosters until they see a failure in Starlink missions. As of December 2022, the record is 15 flights by the same booster.

Recovery of second stages and fairings 
Despite public statements that they would endeavor to make the second-stage reusable as well, by late 2014, SpaceX determined that the mass needed for a heat shield, landing engines, and other equipment to support recovery of the second stage was prohibitive, and abandoned second-stage reusability efforts.

SpaceX developed payload fairings equipped with a steerable parachute as well as RCS thrusters that can be recovered and reused. A payload fairing half was recovered following a soft-landing in the ocean for the first time in March 2017, following SES-10. Subsequently, development began on a ship-based system involving a massive net, in order to catch returning fairings. Two dedicated ships were outfitted for this role, making their first catches in 2019. However, following mixed success, SpaceX returned to water landings and wet recovery.

Launch sites 

By early 2018, F9 was regularly launching from three orbital launch sites: Launch Complex 39A of the Kennedy Space Center, Space Launch Complex 4E of Vandenberg Air Force Base, and Space Launch Complex 40 at Cape Canaveral Air Force Station. The latter was damaged in the AMOS-6 accident in September 2016, but was operational again by December 2017.

Pricing 
At the time of F9's 2010 maiden flight, the price of a v1.0 launch was listed from US$49.9–56 million. The list price increased thereafter, to US$54–59.5 million (2012). 56.5 million (v1.1, August 2013), US$61.2 million (June 2014),  US$62 million (Full Thrust, May 2016), to US$67 million (2022). Dragon cargo missions to the ISS have an average cost of 133 million under a fixed-price contract with NASA, including the cost of the spacecraft. The 2013 DSCOVR mission, launched with Falcon 9 for National Oceanic and Atmospheric Administration (NOAA), cost US$97 million.

In 2004, Elon Musk stated, "Ultimately, I believe 500 per pound (1100/kg) [of payload delivered to orbit] or less is very achievable". At its 2016 launch price with a full LEO payload, Full Thrust launch costs reached US.

In 2011, Musk estimated that fuel and oxidizer for v1.0 cost about 200,000.

By 2018, F9's decreased launch costs drew competitors. Arianespace began working on Ariane 6, United Launch Alliance (ULA) on Vulcan Centaur, and International Launch Services (ILS) on Proton Medium.

On 26 June 2019, Jonathan Hofeller (SpaceX vice president of commercial sales) said that price discounts given to early customers on mission with reused boosters had become the standard price. In October 2019, Falcon 9's "base price" of US$62 million per launch was lowered to US$52 million for flights scheduled in 2021 and beyond.

On 10 April 2020, Roscosmos administrator Dmitry Rogozin, said that his outfit was cutting prices by 30%, alleging that SpaceX was price dumping by charging commercial customers US$60 million per flight while charging NASA between 1.5 and 4x as much for the same flight. Musk denied the claim and replied that the price difference reflected that the F9s were 80% reusable, while Russian rockets were single use. ULA CEO Tory Bruno stated "Our estimate remains around 10 flights as a fleet average to achieve a consistent breakeven point ... and that no one has come anywhere close". However, Elon Musk responded "Payload reduction due to reusability of booster and fairing is <40% for Falcon 9 and recovery and refurb is <10%, so you're roughly even with 2 flights, definitely ahead with 3". CNBC reported in April 2020 that the United States Air Force's launches were costing US$95 million due to needed extra security. SpaceX executive Christopher Couluris stated that reusing rockets could bring prices even lower, that it "costs 28 million to launch it, that's with everything".

Secondary payloads 
F9 payload services include secondary and tertiary payloads mounted via an EELV Secondary Payload Adapter (ESPA) ring, the same interstage adapter first used for launching secondary payloads on US DoD missions that use the Evolved Expendable Launch Vehicles (EELV) Atlas V and Delta IV. This enables secondary and even tertiary missions with minimal impact to the original mission. In 2011, SpaceX announced pricing for ESPA-compatible payloads.

Historical artifacts and museum Falcon 9s 
SpaceX first put a Falcon 9 (B1019) on public display at their headquarters in Hawthorne, California, in 2016.

In 2019, SpaceX donated a Falcon 9 (B1035) to Space Center Houston, in Houston, Texas. It was a booster that flew two missions, "the 11th and 13th supply missions to the International Space Station [and was] the first Falcon 9 rocket NASA agreed to fly a second time".

In 2021, SpaceX donated a Falcon Heavy side booster (B1023) to the Kennedy Space Center Visitor Complex.

Notable payloads
 AMOS-17
 Bangabandhu Satellite-1
 Beresheet lunar lander
 Boeing X-37
 Crew and Cargo Dragon
 CRS-7
 Double Asteroid Redirection Test (DART)
 EchoStar 23
 GPS IIIA launches
 Iridium NEXT constellation
 Launches for the US National Reconnaissance Office, NROL 
 Orbcomm OG2
 RADARSAT Constellation
 SES-10
 Sirius XM launches
 SpaceX Starlink
 Transiting Exoplanet Survey Satellite (TESS)
 Zuma

See also 

 Comparison of orbital launch systems
 List of Falcon 9 first-stage boosters
 SpaceX launch vehicles

Notes

References

External links 

 Falcon 9 official page
 SAOCOM 1B | Launch and Landing
 Test firing of two Merlin 1C engines connected to Falcon 9 first stage, Movie 1, Movie 2 (18 January 2008)
 Press release announcing design (9 September 2005)
 SpaceX hopes to supply ISS with new Falcon 9 heavy launcher (Flight International, 13 September 2005)
 SpaceX launches Falcon 9, With A Customer  (Defense Industry Daily, 15 September 2005)

Articles containing video clips
SpaceX launch vehicles
Partially reusable space launch vehicles
Vehicles introduced in 2010